Gisela Dulko and Flavia Pennetta defeated Květa Peschke and Katarina Srebotnik in the final, 7–5, 6–4 to win the doubles tennis title at the 2010 WTA Tour Championships.

Nuria Llagostera Vives and María José Martínez Sánchez were the reigning champions, but did not qualify this year.

Seeds

Notes :
 Serena Williams /  Venus Williams had qualified but withdrew due to injury.

Draw

Finals

External links
 Draw

Wta Tour Championships - Doubles
Doubles